Skilbeck is a surname of English origin. Notable people with the surname include:

Dolly Skilbeck, fictional character from the British television soap opera Emmerdale
John Skilbeck (born 1958), Australian cricketer
Malcolm Skilbeck, Australian educationist
Matt Skilbeck, fictional character from the British television soap opera Emmerdale
Peggy Skilbeck, fictional character from the British television soap opera Emmerdale
Samuel Skilbeck, fictional character from the British television soap opera Emmerdale

See also
Skillebekk

References